The Marianao baseball club played in the Cuban Professional League from the 1922–1923 season through to the 1960–1961 season. The club represented the populous town of Marianao in Havana and played their games at La Tropicana Stadium, official site of the league.

History
According to some baseball historians, the Elefantes de Marianao (Marianao Elephants) was the first nickname used by the team. Although it is a little studied topic, the 1923-24 Billiken baseball card set includes pictures 15 cards each for each team that participated in the Cuban league during that season: Almendares, Habana, Santa Clara and Marianao. Indeed, Marianao players are wearing a uniform that shows the head of a white elephant on dark background.

At some point, the team wore gray uniforms and was recognized as the Marianao Frailes Grises (Grey Monks), probably a nickname based on the color of the robes of the Dominican and Augustinian monks that founded Marianao in 1719. Then, in 1948 the franchise was renamed as the Tigres de Marianao (Marianao Tigers), as they are usually cited, and also used a new uniform. Their flannels had black and orange piping with matching socks, perhaps recalling also those of its emblem, the tiger. The team contended until the 1960–1961 period, during what turned out to be the Cuban League's final season.

The Marianao squad participated in 27 Cuban league seasons, finishing in first place four times, second place six times, third place seven times, and in fourth place a league record ten times. The team posted a 729-861 record in 1,590 games for a .458 winning percentage, which was the worst mark of the four Cuban league teams to play over 1,000 games.

Marianao, managed by Merito Acosta, won its first title in the 1922–1923 season, to become the only team after Habana to win the league championship in its inaugural season. They earned its second championship in the 1936–1937 campaign, managed by Martin Dihigo, and clinched consecutive titles in the 1956–1957 and 1957–1958 seasons, guided by Napoleón Reyes. The latter two seasons they won the Caribbean Series, the only Series where they participated, becoming also the first team to win twice in the event's history.

Following the 1959 Cuban Revolution, political tensions rose with the Fidel Castro government. In March 1961, one month after the regular Cuban baseball season ended, the regime decreed the abolition of professional baseball in Cuba.

Facts
During the 1943–1944 season, the Marianao team became part of three rare occurrences in Cuban baseball history.

On December 2, 1943, Ramón Roger of the Elefantes de Cienfuegos pitched 11 scoreless innings against them in one game that went 20 innings and lasted four hours and 25 minutes, the longest game ever played in Cuban baseball history. Roger was credited with the victory, 6–5. Meanwhile, Luis Tiant Sr. blanked Cienfuegos for 14 innings, but was victimized by an error by shortstop Oral (Mickey) Burnette and suffered a heartbreaking loss.

A few days later on December 11, Habana pitcher Manuel García hurled a no-hit, no-run game against Marianao at La Tropicana Stadium. It turned in to be the first no-hitter pitched at La Tropicana since its opening in 1930. Also in the same game, the Marianao infield executed the first triple play at the La Tropical grounds.

Notable players

José Acosta
Merito Acosta
Julio Bécquer 
Harold Bevan 
Jim Bunning 
Jack Calvo
Tony Castaño
Pelayo Chacón
Sandalio Consuegra
Ray Dandridge
Solly Drake 
Charlie Dressen
Freddie Fitzsimmons
Pedro Formental
Mike Fornieles 
Silvio García
Billy Herman
Buck Leonard
Adolfo Luque
Conrado Marrero 
Minnie Miñoso
Willy Miranda
Don Newcombe
Roberto Ortiz
Emilio Palmero 
Pedro Ramos
Lázaro Salazar
Hank Schreiber
Bob Shaw
Hal Smith 
Milton Smith
José Valdivielso 
Bill Werle 
Casey Wise

See also
 1957 Caribbean Series Summary
 1958 Caribbean Series Summary

References

External links
Franchise history at Seamheads.com

Baseball teams in Cuba
Cuban League teams
Defunct baseball teams in Cuba